Des Sowden (born 13 August 1974, in Plymouth, England) is a former British professional boxer. He is considered to be one of the worst, if not the worst, professional boxer of all time.

Career

During his two-year professional career, he won just one fight, in which the opponent was disqualified. During his career he was knocked out in under a minute twice and just over a minute once in just 11 bouts. He holds the record for the fastest to be knocked out in a boxing match, being knocked out in the first punch within just two seconds. After this, he retired from boxing.

Trivia

Congolese boxer Ted Bami fought his first ever fight against Sowden, knocking him out in just 86 seconds.

Publications

 Historical Dictionary of Boxing: by John Grasso
 The Mammoth Book of Losers: by Karl Shaw

References

1974 births
Living people
English male boxers
Light-welterweight boxers